Justin Timberlake is an American singer-songwriter, actor, dancer, and record producer. He is the recipient of 10 Grammy Awards, 4 Emmy Awards, 7 American Music Awards, 3 Brit Awards, 9 Billboard Music Awards, 11 MTV Video Music Awards and 29 ASCAP Awards. Overall, Timberlake has received 176 awards from 522 nominations .

His debut solo album, Justified, generated the singles "Like I Love You", "Rock Your Body", "Señorita", and the Grammy Award for Best Male Pop Vocal Performance-winning song "Cry Me a River". Also nominated for Album of the Year, it took home the Grammy Award for Best Pop Vocal Album. Among other awards, it earned him American Music Awards for Favorite Pop/Rock Album, Brit Awards for International Album and International Male, MTV Europe Music Awards for Best Album and Best Male, and MTV Video Music Awards for Best Male Video and Best Pop Video–the latter two for "Cry Me a River."

Timberlake's sophomore album FutureSex/LoveSounds garnered him seven Grammy nominations, including Album of the Year. Its singles "SexyBack" (in 2007) and "LoveStoned" (2008) both won Best Dance Recording, while "My Love" won Best Rap/Sung Collaboration. "What Goes Around... Comes Around" was nominated for Record of the Year and won Best Male Pop Vocal Performance. The album won the American Music Awards for Favorite Pop/Rock Album and Favorite Soul/R&B Album.

Timberlake received the Michael Jackson Video Vanguard Award and won Video of the Year for "Mirrors" at the 2013 MTV Video Music Awards. He attended the 2014 Billboard Music Awards taking home seven awards, including Top Artist and Top Billboard 200 Album for The 20/20 Experience. Timberlake earned seven Grammy nominations at the 2014 ceremony, winning Best Music Video for "Suit & Tie", Best R&B Song for "Pusher Love Girl", and Best Rap/Sung Collaboration for "Holy Grail". For his third and fourth studio album he also won three American Music Awards and three People's Choice Awards. Timberlake was presented with the Innovator Award at the 2015 iHeartRadio Music Awards. In October 2015, he was inducted into the Memphis Music Hall of Fame, becoming its youngest member. He received the inaugural Decade Award at the 2016 Teen Choice Awards.

Timberlake has won four Emmy Awards, twice for Outstanding Original Music and Lyrics and twice for Outstanding Guest Actor in a Comedy Series. Additionally, he has received two nominations for a Golden Globe Award for Best Original Song. In 2017, Timberlake received a nomination for an Academy Award for Best Original Song for "Can't Stop the Feeling!". In 2019, he received the Contemporary Icon Award by the Songwriters Hall of Fame.

4Music Video Honours
The Music Video Honours is an annual music awards show by 4Music, a music and entertainment channel in the United Kingdom.

!
|-
|2014
| Justin Timberlake
|Best Boy
| 
| style="text-align:center;"|

Academy Awards
The Academy Awards, or "Oscars", is an annual American awards ceremony hosted by the Academy of Motion Picture Arts and Sciences (AMPAS) to recognize excellence in cinematic achievements in the United States film industry as assessed by the Academy's voting membership.

!
|-
| 2017
| "Can't Stop the Feeling!" 
| Best Original Song
| 
|style="text-align:center;"|

AICE Awards

!
|-
| 2014 || "Mirrors" || Best Music Video ||  || 
|-
| 2017 || "Can't Stop the Feeling!" || Best Music Video ||  || 
|}

American Music Awards
The American Music Awards is an annual awards ceremony created by Dick Clark in 1973 and one of several annual major American music awards shows (among the others are the Grammy Awards, the MTV Video Music Awards etc.). Justin Timberlake has won seven awards out of thirteen nominations.

!
|-
| rowspan="4" |2003
| rowspan="3" |Justin Timberlake
| Fan Choice Award
|
| style="text-align:center;" rowspan="4" | 
|-
| Favorite Pop/Rock Male Artist
|
|-
| International Artist of the Year Award
|
|-
| Justified
| Favorite Pop/Rock Album
|
|-
| rowspan="3" |2007
| rowspan="1" |Justin Timberlake
| Favorite Pop/Rock Male Artist
|
| style="text-align:center;" rowspan="3" |
|-
| rowspan="2" |FutureSex/LoveSounds
| Favorite Pop/Rock Album
|
|-
| Favorite Soul/R&B Album
|
|-
| rowspan="5" |2013
| rowspan="3" |Justin Timberlake
| Artist of the Year
| 
| style="text-align:center;" rowspan="5" |
|-
| Favorite Pop/Rock Male Artist
| 
|-
| Favorite Soul/R&B Male Artist
| 
|-
|rowspan="2" | The 20/20 Experience
| Favorite Pop/Rock Album
|
|-
|Favorite Soul/R&B Album
|
|- 
| 2017
| Trolls: Original Motion Picture Soundtrack
| Top Soundtrack
| 
| style="text-align:center;"|

Apple
American multinational corporation Apple Inc. releases its own annual editorial year-end best-of list from their media library and management application iTunes, unveiled on the global virtual store along with lists of its most-downloaded content.

!
|-
|2013
|Justin Timberlake
|Best Musical Performer
|
| style="text-align:center;"| 
|}

APRA Music Awards 
The APRA Awards are several award ceremonies run in Australia by Australian Performing Right Association, which includes the APRA Music Awards, to recognise composing and songwriting skills, sales and airplay performance by its members annually.

!
|-
| 2017
| "Can't Stop the Feeling!"
| International Work of the Year
| 
| style="text-align:center;"| 
|}

ASCAP Awards 
The American Society of Composers, Authors and Publishers (ASCAP) is a not-for-profit performance rights organization that protects its members' musical copyrights by monitoring public performances of their music, whether via a broadcast or live performance, and compensating them accordingly.

ASCAP Pop Music Awards 

!
|-
|rowspan="2"| 2003
| "Girlfriend"
|rowspan="20"| Most Performed Songs
| 
| style="text-align:center;" rowspan="2"| 
|-
| "Gone"
| 
|-
|rowspan="2"| 2004
| "Cry Me a River"
| 
| style="text-align:center;"|  
|-
| "Rock Your Body"
| 
| style="text-align:center;"|
|-
|rowspan="2"| 2007
| "My Love" 
|
| style="text-align:center;" rowspan="2" |

|-
| "SexyBack" 
| 
|-
|rowspan="5"| 2008
| "Give It to Me"
| 
| style="text-align:center;" rowspan="5" | 
|-
| "My Love" 
|
|-
| "Summer Love/Set The Mood"
| 
|-
| "Until The End Of Time" 
| 
|-
| "What Goes Around... Comes Around"
| 
|-
|rowspan="1"| 2010
| "Dead and Gone"
| 
| style="text-align:center;" rowspan="1" | 
|-
|rowspan="1"| 2011
| "Carry Out"
| 
| style="text-align:center;" rowspan="1" | 
|-
|rowspan="3"|2014
| "Holy Grail"
| 
| style="text-align:center;" rowspan="3" | 
|-
| "Mirrors"
| 
|-
| "Suit & Tie"
| 
|-
|rowspan="2"|2015
| "Mirrors"
| 
| style="text-align:center;" rowspan="2" | 
|-
| "Not a Bad Thing"
| 
|-
| 2017
| "Can't Stop the Feeling!"
| 
| style="text-align:center;" | 
|-
| 2018
| "Can't Stop the Feeling!"
| 
| style="text-align:center;" | 
|}

ASCAP Rhythm & Soul Awards 

!
|-
|rowspan="2"|2008
|"My Love"
|rowspan="3" | Award Winning R&B/Hip-Hop Songs
| 
| style="text-align:center;" rowspan="2" | 
|-
|"Until The End of Time"
| 
|-
|rowspan="2"|2010
|rowspan="2"|"Dead and Gone"
| 
| style="text-align:center;" rowspan="1" | 
|-
| Award Winning Rap Songs
| 
| style="text-align:center;" rowspan="1" | 
|-
|rowspan="4"|2014
| "Holy Grail"
|rowspan="3"| Award Winning R&B/Hip-Hop Songs
| 
| style="text-align:center;" rowspan="4" | 
|-
| "Suit & Tie"
| 
|-
| "Take Back the Night"
| 
|-
| "Holy Grail" 
| Top Rap Song
| 
|-
| 2015
| "Partition"
| Award Winning R&B/Hip-Hop Songs
| 
| style="text-align:center;"|  
|}

BBC Music Awards
The BBC Music Awards are the BBC's annual pop music awards, held every December, as a celebration of the musical achievements over the past twelve months. The event is coordinated by the BBC's music division, BBC Music.

!
|-
| 2016
| "Can't Stop the Feeling!"
| Song of the Year
| 
| style="text-align:center;"|
|}

BBC Radio 1Xtra Hot Summer Awards
BBC Radio 1Xtra Hot Summer Awards have been handed out since 2013 by BBC Radio 1Xtra, a British digital radio station by the British Broadcasting Corporation (BBC) specialising in urban music.

!
|-
| align="center"| 2013
|"Holy Grail" (with Jay Z)
|Hottie Guest Winner 
|
|style="text-align:center;" rowspan="1"|

Berlin Music Video Awards

!
|-
| 2018 || Filthy || Best VFX ||  || 
|}

BET Awards
The BET Awards were established in 2001 by the Black Entertainment Television network to celebrate African Americans and other minorities in music, acting, sports, and other fields of entertainment over the past year. Justin Timberlake has been nominated eight times.

!
|-
|rowspan="2"|2003
|rowspan="3"| Justin Timberlake
| Best New Artist
|
|style="text-align:center;" rowspan="2"|
|-
|rowspan="2"| Best R&B Male Artist
|
|-
|rowspan="4"|2013
|
|style="text-align:center;" rowspan="4"|
|-

|rowspan="3"|"Suit & Tie" (with Jay Z)

| Best Collaboration
|

|-
| Video of the Year

|

|-

| Viewer's Choice
|
|-
|rowspan= "2"|2014
|Justin Timberlake
|Best Male R&B/Pop Artist
|
|style="text-align:center;" rowspan="2"|

|-
|"Holy Grail" (with Jay Z)
|Best Collaboration

|
|-
|}

BET Hip Hop Awards

!
|-
|2014
|"Holy Grail" (with Jay Z)
|Best Collabo, Duo or Group

|
|style="text-align:center;" |
|-
|}

Billboard Awards

Billboard Music Awards
The Billboard Music Awards are sponsored by Billboard magazine and is based on sales data by Nielsen SoundScan and radio information by Nielsen Broadcast Data Systems. Justin Timberlake has won nine awards out of twenty-six nominations.

!
|-
|rowspan="3"|2003
|rowspan="3"| Justin Timberlake
| Artist of the Year
|
| style="text-align:center;" rowspan="3" |
|-
| New Artist of the Year
|
|-
| Hot 100 Male Artist of the Year
|
|-
|rowspan="4"|2006
|rowspan="3"| Justin Timberlake
|Top Pop Artist - Male
|
| style="text-align:center;" rowspan="4" |
|-
|Top Digital Album Artist
|
|-
| Top Hot 100 Singles Artist - Male
|
|-
| FutureSex/LoveSounds
| Top Digital Album
|
|-
|rowspan="12"|2014
|rowspan="6"| Justin Timberlake
| Top Artist
|
| style="text-align:center;" rowspan="12" |
|-
| Top Male Artist
|
|-
| Top Hot 100 Artist
|
|-
|Top Radio Songs Artist
|
|-
|Top R&B Artist
|
|-
|Top Billboard 200 Artist
|
|-
|rowspan="2"| The 20/20 Experience
| Top Billboard 200 Album
|
|-
|rowspan="2"| Top R&B Album
|
|-
|The 20/20 Experience (2 of 2)
|
|-
|"Mirrors"
| Top Radio Song
|
|-
|"Suit & Tie" (with Jay Z)
| Top R&B Song
|
|-
|"Holy Grail" (with Jay Z)
| Top Rap Song
|
|-
|rowspan="2"|2015
|rowspan="2"| Justin Timberlake
| Top Male Artist
|
| style="text-align:center;" rowspan="2" |
|-
| Top Touring Artist
|
|-
|rowspan=5|2017
|rowspan=3|"Can't Stop the Feeling!"
| Top Hot 100 Song
| 
|style="text-align:center;" rowspan=5|
|-
| Top Selling Song
| 
|-
| Top Radio Song
| 
|-
| Justin Timberlake
| Top Song Sales Artist
| 
|-
| Trolls: Original Motion Picture Soundtrack
| Top Soundtrack/Cast Album
| 
|}

Billboard.com Mid-Year Music Awards
The Billboard.com Mid-Year Music Awards are held by Billboard to recognize the most favorite artists, songs, albums and performances of the first half of year. Winners are selected through a poll in Billboard official website. Justin Timberlake has been nominated seven times.

!
|-
|rowspan="7"|2013
|rowspan="4"| Justin Timberlake
| Best Comeback
|
| style="text-align:center;" rowspan="7"|
|-
| Best Style
|
|-
| First-Half MVP
|
|-
| Most Overrated Artist
|
|-
| The 20/20 Experience
| Favorite No. 1 Billboard 200 Album
|
|-
| The 20/20 Experience – 2 of 2
|rowspan="2"| Most Anticipated Music Event of 2013's Second Half
|
|-
| Legends of the Summer Stadium Tour (with Jay Z)
|

Billboard Touring Awards
The Billboard Touring Awards is an annual meeting sponsored by Billboard which also honors the top international live entertainment industry artists and professionals.

!
|-
|2007
|rowspan="3"| Justin Timberlake
| Breakthrough
|
| style="text-align:center;"| 
|-
|rowspan="2"|2014
| Best Tour
|
| style="text-align:center;" rowspan="2"|
|-
| Best Draw
|

Bravo A-List Awards
Bravo A-List Awards were presented by Bravo (U.S. TV network).

!
|-
|2009
| Justin Timberlake
| Style Male
|
| style="text-align:center;"|
|}

Bravo Otto
Bravo Otto award is a German accolade honoring excellence of performers in film, television and music. Presented annually since 1957, winners are selected by the readers of Bravo magazine. The award is presented in gold, silver and bronze.

!
|-
| 2003
| rowspan=3|Justin Timberlake
| rowspan=3| Male Singer
|
| style="text-align:center;"|
|-
| 2006
|
| style="text-align:center;"|
|-
| 2007
|
| style="text-align:center;"|
|-
|}

Brit Awards
The Brit Awards are the British Phonographic Industry's (BPI) annual pop music awards. Justin Timberlake has received three awards from six nominations.

!
|-
|rowspan="3"|2004
|rowspan="2"| Justin Timberlake
| International Male
|
| style="text-align:center;" rowspan="3"|
|-
| Best Pop Act
|
|-
| Justified
| International Album
|
|-
|rowspan="2"|2007
| Justin Timberlake
| International Male Solo Artist
|
| style="text-align:center;" rowspan="2"|
|-
| FutureSex/LoveSounds
| International Album
|
|-
|2014
|Justin Timberlake
|International Male Solo Artist
|
| style="text-align:center;"|
|}

Camerimage
The International Film Festival of the Art of Cinematography Camerimage is a festival taking place in Poland and dedicated to the celebration of cinematography and recognition of its creators, cinematographers. The Camerimage festival spans over a course of one week, with multiple events at one time. Timberlake has two nominations.

!
|-
| 2013 || "Suit & Tie" (with Jay Z) || rowspan=2| Best Music Video ||  || 
|-
| 2018 || "Say Something" (with Chris Stapleton) ||  ||

Cedars-Sinai Board of Governors Gala
The Gala benefits the Board of Governors Heart Stem Cell Center at Cedars-Sinai Medical Center.

!
|-
|2009
|Justin Timberlake
|Heart of Hollywood Award
|
| style="text-align:center;"|

|}

Channel V Thailand Music Video Awards
The Channel V Thailand Music Video Awards were established in 2002 by Channel V Thailand.

!
|-
| 2004
| Justin Timberlake 
| Popular Male Artist 
| 
| style="text-align:center;"|

CMT Music Awards
The CMT Music Awards is a fan-voted awards show for country music videos and television performances.

!
|-
| rowspan=2| 2018
| rowspan=2| "Say Something" 
| Video of the Year
| 
| style="text-align:center;" rowspan=2|
|-
| Collaborative Video of the Year
|

Costume Designers Guild Awards

!
|-
| 2019 || Supplies || Excellence in Short Film Design ||  || 
|}

Critics' Choice Awards
The Critics' Choice Awards (formerly known as the Broadcast Film Critics Association Awards) is an awards show presented annually by the Broadcast Film Critics Association (BFCA) to honor the finest in cinematic achievement. The Broadcast Film Critics Association (BFCA) is an association of approximately 250 television, radio and online critics. Founded in 1995,  it is the largest film critics organization in the United States and Canada.

!
|-
|2011
|The Social Network
|Best Acting Ensemble
|
| style="text-align:center;"|
|-
|2013
|"Please Mr. Kennedy"
|Best Song
|
| style="text-align:center;"|
|-
|2016
| "Can't Stop the Feeling!"
|Best Song
|
| style="text-align:center;"|

DanceStar Awards

!
|-
|rowspan="2"| 2003 
| Justin Timberlake 
| Best Chart Act 
| 
| style="text-align:center;" rowspan="2" | 
|-
| Like I Love You (with Clipse) 
| Best Remix (International) 
| 
|-
| 2004 
| Rock Your Body 
| Best Remix (International) 
| 
| style="text-align:center;" rowspan="1" |

Danish Music Awards
The Danish Music Awards (DMA) is a Danish award show, arranged by the IFPI since 1989.

!
|-
| rowspan="2" |2003 
| Justin Timberlake   
| Year's New Foreign Name
| 
| style="text-align:center;" rowspan="2" | 
|-
| Justified  
| Foreign Album of the Year 
| 
|-
| 2007 
| FutureSex/LoveSounds 
| Foreign Album of the Year 
| 
| style="text-align:center;" rowspan="1" |

Denver Film Critics Society
The Denver Film Critics Society is an organization of film critics based in Denver, Colorado.

!
|-
| 2017
| Can't Stop the Feeling!
| Best Original Song
| 
| 
|}

ECHO Awards
An ECHO is a German music award granted every year by the Deutsche Phono-Akademie (an association of recording companies). Each year's winner is determined by the previous year's sales. The ECHO is the successor to the Deutscher Schallplattenpreis (German Record Award).

!
|-
| 2004
| rowspan="3"|Justin Timberlake  
| rowspan="3"|Best International Rock/Pop Artist of the Year
| 
| style="text-align:center;" rowspan="2" | 
|-
| 2007
| 
|-
| 2014
| 
| style="text-align:center;"|

Emmy Awards
The Emmy Award, often referred to simply as the Emmy, is a television production award, similar in nature to the Peabody Awards but more focused on entertainment, and is considered the television equivalent to the Academy Awards (for film), Grammy Awards (for music), and the Tony Awards (for theatre). Justin Timberlake has received four awards from eight nominations.

!
|-
| 2007 || Saturday Night Live for "Dick in a Box"  || rowspan="3"|Outstanding Original Music and Lyrics ||  || style="text-align:center;"|
|-
| rowspan="3" | 2009 || 2008 ESPY Awards for "I Love Sports"  ||  ||style="text-align:center;" rowspan="3" |
|-
|Saturday Night Live for "Motherlover"  || 
|-
|rowspan="2"|Saturday Night Live||rowspan="2" |Outstanding Guest Actor in a Comedy Series ||  
|-
|rowspan="3" | 2011 || ||style="text-align:center;" rowspan="3" |
|-
|Saturday Night Live for "Opening monologue"  || rowspan="2" | Outstanding Original Music and Lyrics ||  
|-
|Saturday Night Live for "3-Way (The Golden Rule)"  || 
|-
| 2013 || Saturday Night Live || Outstanding Guest Actor in a Comedy Series ||  || style="text-align:center;"|
|}

Environmental Media Awards
The Environmental Media Awards is an award ceremony which celebrates the entertainment industry's environmental efforts. Timberlake has received the Futures Award for his green-conscious Tennessee golf course.

!
|-
|rowspan="1"|2011
| Justin Timberlake
| Futures Award
|
|style="text-align:center;"|
|}

Ethnic Multicultural Media Academy

!
|-
| 2003
| Justin Timberlake
| Best International Music Act / Production
|
| 
|}

Fashion Group International's Night of The Stars Gala
The Night of The Stars Gala is held by the Fashion Group International. Timberlake has received the Lord & Taylor's Fashion Oracle Award in recognition for his clothing line William Rast.

!
|-
|rowspan="1"|2015
| Justin Timberlake
| Lord & Taylor's Fashion Oracle Award
|
|style="text-align:center;"|
|}

Fryderyk
The Fryderyk is the annual award in Polish music.

!
|-
| 2006
| FutureSex/LoveSounds 
| Best Foreign Album 
| 
|style="text-align:center;"|

GAFFA Awards

GAFFA Awards (Denmark)
Delivered since 1991, the GAFFA Awards (Danish: GAFFA Prisen) are a Danish award that rewards popular music awarded by the magazine of the same name.

!
|-
|2006
|rowspan="2"|Justin Timberlake
|International Male Artist of the Year
|
|style="text-align:center;"|
|-
|rowspan="2"|2013
|International Male Artist of the Year
|
|rowspan="2" style="text-align:center;"|
|-
|The 20/20 Experience
|International Album of the Year
|
|-
|2016
|"Can't Stop the Feeling!"
|International Hit of the Year
|
|style="text-align:center;"|
|}

GAFFA Awards (Norway)
Delivered since 2012. The GAFFA Awards (Norwegian: GAFFA Prisen) are a Norwegian award that rewards popular music awarded by the magazine of the same name.

!
|-
| 2018
| Justin Timberlake
| Best International Solo Artist of the Year
|
| style="text-align:center;" rowspan="1"|
|}

GAFFA Awards (Sweden)
Delivered since 2010. The GAFFA Awards (Swedish: GAFFA Priset) are a Swedish award that rewards popular music awarded by the magazine of the same name.

!
|-
| 2019
| Justin Timberlake
| Best International Solo Artist of the Year 
|
| style="text-align:center;" rowspan="1"|
|}

Gaygalan Awards
Since 1999, the Gaygalan Awards are a Swedish accolade presented by the QX magazine.

!
|-
|2017
|"Can't Stop the Feeling!"
|International Song of the Year
|
|style="text-align:center;"|
|}

GLSEN Annual Respect Awards
Gay, Lesbian and Straight Education Network organizes the annual GLSEN Respect Awards to honor personalities and organizations considered committed allies to the LGBT community.

!
|-
|2015
|Justin Timberlake and Jessica Biel
|Inspiration Award
|
|style="text-align:center;"|
|}

Golden Globe Awards
The Golden Globe Award is an American accolade bestowed by the 93 members of the Hollywood Foreign Press Association (HFPA) recognizing excellence in film and television, both domestic and foreign. The annual formal ceremony and dinner at which the awards are presented is a major part of the film industry's awards season, which culminates each year with the Academy Awards.

!
|-
|rowspan="1"|2014
|"Please Mr. Kennedy" (with Ed Rush, George Cromarty, T Bone Burnett & Joel Coen and Ethan Coen)
| rowspan="2" | Best Original Song
|
|style="text-align:center;"|
|-
| 2017
| "Can't Stop the Feeling!" 
|
|style="text-align:center;"|

Groovevolt Music and Fashion Awards

!
|-
|rowspan=3|2004
| Justified
| Best Album - Male
|
|style="text-align:center;" rowspan="3" |
|-
| "Never Again"
| Best Deep Cut
|
|-
| "Cry Me a River"
| Best Song Performance - Male
|

Guild of Music Supervisors Awards
The Guild of Music Supervisors Awards recognize music supervisors in 14 categories, representing movies, television, games and trailers. 

!
|-
|2017
| "Can't Stop the Feeling!" 
|Best Song/Recording Created for a Film
|
|style="text-align:center;"|

GQ Men of the Year Awards
British magazine GQ launched their annual Men of the Year awards in 2009.

!
|-
|2003
|rowspan="3"| Justin Timberlake
|Showman of the Year
|
| style="text-align:center;"|
|-
|2006
|International Man of the Year
|
| style="text-align:center;"|
|-
|2013
|#Hashtag of the Year
|
| style="text-align:center;"|
|}

Grammy Awards
The Grammy Awards are awarded annually by The Recording Academy of the United States for outstanding achievements in the music industry. Considered the highest music honor, the awards were established in 1958. Justin Timberlake has won 10 awards out of 39 nominations. His wins include categories on the pop, dance, R&B, and visual media fields. 8 nominations as part of NSYNC are counted. Two of Timberlake's studio albums have been nominated for Album of the Year so far: Justified in 2004, and FutureSex/LoveSounds in 2007.

!
|-
| rowspan="2"|2000 
| "Music of My Heart" 
| Best Pop Collaboration with Vocals 
| 
| style="text-align:center;" rowspan=2| 
|-
| "God Must Have Spent a Little More Time on You" 
| Best Country Collaboration with Vocals 
| 
|-
| rowspan="3"| 2001 
| rowspan="2"| "Bye Bye Bye" 
| Record of the Year 
| 
| style="text-align:center;" rowspan=3|
|-
| Best Pop Performance by a Duo or Group with Vocals 
| 
|-
| No Strings Attached || Best Pop Vocal Album 
| 
|-
|rowspan=3|2002
| "My Kind of Girl" (with Brian McKnight)
| Best Pop Collaboration with Vocals
| 
|style="text-align:center;" rowspan=3|
|-
| "Gone" 
| Best Pop Performance by a Duo or Group with Vocals
| 
|-
| Celebrity 
| Best Pop Vocal Album
| 
|-
|rowspan=2|2003
| "Like I Love You" (with Clipse)
| Best Rap/Sung Collaboration
| 
|style="text-align:center;" rowspan=2|
|-
| "Girlfriend" 
| Best Pop Performance by a Duo or Group with Vocals
| 
|-
|rowspan="5"|2004
|rowspan="2"| Justified
| Album of the Year
| 
| rowspan="5" style="text-align:center;"|
|-
| Best Pop Vocal Album
| 
|-
| "Cry Me a River"
| Best Male Pop Vocal Performance
| 
|-
|rowspan="2"|"Where Is the Love?" (with The Black Eyed Peas)
| Record of the Year
| 
|-
| Best Rap/Sung Collaboration
| 
|-
|rowspan="4"|2007
|rowspan="2"| FutureSex/LoveSounds
| Album of the Year
| 
| rowspan="4" style="text-align:center;"|
|-
| Best Pop Vocal Album
| 
|-
| "My Love" (with T.I.)
| Best Rap/Sung Collaboration
| 
|-
| "SexyBack"
| Best Dance Recording
| 
|-
|rowspan="5"|2008
| "Ayo Technology" (with 50 Cent)
| Best Rap Song
| 
| rowspan="5" style="text-align:center;"|
|-
| "Give It to Me" (with Timbaland & Nelly Furtado)
| Best Pop Collaboration with Vocals
| 
|-
| "LoveStoned/I Think She Knows"
| Best Dance Recording
| 
|-
|rowspan="2"| "What Goes Around... Comes Around"
| Record of the Year
| 
|-
| Best Male Pop Vocal Performance
| 
|-
|2009
| "4 Minutes" (with Madonna)
| Best Pop Collaboration with Vocals
| 
| style="text-align:center;"|
|-
|rowspan="3"|2010
|rowspan="2"| "Dead and Gone" (with T.I.)
| Best Rap Song
| 
| rowspan="3" style="text-align:center;"|
|-
| Best Rap/Sung Collaboration
| 
|-
| "Love Sex Magic" (with Ciara)
| Best Pop Collaboration with Vocals
| 
|-
|rowspan="7"|2014
| The 20/20 Experience – The Complete Experience
| Best Pop Vocal Album
| 
|style="text-align:center;" rowspan="7"|
|-
| "Mirrors"
| Best Pop Solo Performance
| 
|-
|rowspan="2"|"Suit & Tie" (with Jay Z)
| Best Pop Duo/Group Performance
| 
|-
| Best Music Video
| 
|-
| "Pusher Love Girl"
| Best R&B Song
| 
|-
|rowspan="2"| "Holy Grail" (with Jay Z)
| Best Rap/Sung Collaboration
| 
|-
| Best Rap Song
| 
|-
|rowspan="2"|2015
| Beyoncé (as producer)
|rowspan="2"| Album of the Year
|
| rowspan="2" style="text-align:center;"|
|-
| G I R L (as featured artist)
| 
|-
|2017
| "Can't Stop the Feeling!"
| Best Song Written for Visual Media
| 
| style="text-align:center;"|
|-
|2019
| "Say Something" 
| Best Pop Duo/Group Performance
| 
| style="text-align:center;"|
|-

The Recording Academy Honors
The Recording Academy Honors Award was established to celebrate outstanding individuals whose work embodies excellence and integrity and who have improved the environment for the creative community.

!
|-
|2005
|Justin Timberlake
|Memphis Chapter's The Recording Academy Honors
|
|style="text-align:center;"|
|}

Hasty Pudding Theatricals Awards
The Hasty Pudding Man of the Year award is bestowed annually by the Hasty Pudding Theatricals society at Harvard University.

!
|-
|2010
|Justin Timberlake
|Man of the Year
|
| style="text-align:center;"|
|}

Helpmann Awards

!
|-
| 2008 || Justin Timberlake || Best International Contemporary Concert ||  || 
|}

Hollywood Film Awards
The Hollywood Film Awards are an American motion picture award ceremony held annually since 1997. In 2016, Timberlake was honored with the Hollywood Song Award for "Can't Stop the Feeling!".

!
|-
| 2010 || The Social Network || Ensemble of the Year ||  || style="text-align:center;"|
|-
| 2016 || "Can't Stop the Feeling!" || Hollywood Song Award ||  || style="text-align:center;"|

Hollywood Music in Media Awards
The Hollywood Music in Media Awards (HMMA) honors music in film, TV, video games, commercials and trailers.

!
|-
|rowspan=3| 2016 || "Can't Stop the Feeling!" || Best Song Written for an Animated Film ||  || style="text-align:center;" rowspan=3|
|-
| Trolls: Original Motion Picture Soundtrack || Best Soundtrack from a Movie || 
|-
| Justin Timberlake || Outstanding Music Supervision – Film ||

Hungarian Music Awards
The Hungarian Music Awards have been given to artists in the field of Hungarian music since 1992.

!
|-
| 2008 || FutureSex/LoveSounds || Pop Album of the Year ||  || style="text-align:center;"| 
|-
| 2017 || "Can't Stop the Feeling!" || Modern Pop-Rock Album/Record of the Year ||  || style="text-align:center;"|

IFPI Hong Kong Top Sales Music Award
Presented by the International Federation of the Phonographic Industry representing the recording industry in Hong Kong.

!
|-
| 2006
|FutureSex/LoveSounds
|Ten Best Sales Releases, Foreign
| 
| style="text-align:center;"| 
|-
|}

iHeartRadio Much Music Video Awards
The iHeartRadio Much Music Video Awards (formerly known as MuchMusic Video Awards) is an annual awards ceremony presented by the Canadian music video channel MuchMusic. Justin Timberlake has been nominated four times.

!
|-
| 2007
| "What Goes Around... Comes Around"
| rowspan=3 | International Video of the Year - Artist
|
| style="text-align:center;"|
|-
| 2008
| "4 Minutes" (with Madonna)
|
| style="text-align:center;"|
|-
| 2013
| "Mirrors"
| 
| style="text-align:center;"|
|-
| 2018
|"Say Something" (featuring Chris Stapleton, with director Arturo Perez Jr.)
|Best Director
|
| style="text-align:center;" rowspan="1"|

iHeartRadio Music Awards
The iHeartRadio Music Awards is an American music awards show debuting in 2014. Justin Timberlake received the Innovator Award at the second ceremony.

!
|-
| rowspan="5" | 2014 || Justin Timberlake ||   Artist of the Year ||  || style="text-align:center;" rowspan="5" |
|-
| "Mirrors" ||   Song of the Year || 
|-
|"Suit & Tie" (featuring Jay Z) ||  Best Collaboration || 
|-
| rowspan="2" | "Holy Grail" (with Jay Z) ||   Best Collaboration || 
|-
|  Hip Hop/R&B Song of the Year || 
|-
| 2015 || Justin Timberlake ||  Innovator Award ||  || style="text-align:center;"|
|-
| 2016 || Justin Timberlake || Biggest Triple Threat ||  || style="text-align:center;"|
|-
|rowspan="3" | 2017
|rowspan="3" | "Can't Stop the Feeling!"
| Song of the Year 
|  
| rowspan="3"|
|-
|Best Song from a Movie
|
|-
|Best Music Video
|
|}

InStyle Social Media Awards
These are awarded by the InStyle magazine.

!
|-
|2014
|Justin Timberlake
|The Sexiest Man of Style
|
| style="text-align:center;"|
|}

International Dance Music Awards
The International Dance Music Awards were established in 1985. It is a part of the Winter Music Conference, a weeklong electronic music event held annually. 

!
|-
|rowspan="3"| 2003
|Justin Timberlake
|Best Dance Artist Solo
|
| style="text-align:center;" rowspan="3" |
|-
|rowspan="2"| "Like I Love You" 
|Best Pop Dance Track
|
|-
|Best R&B/Urban Track
|
|-
| 2004
| "Rock Your Body"
|Best Pop 
|
| style="text-align:center;" rowspan="1" |
|-
|rowspan="3"| 2007
|Justin Timberlake
|Best Dance Solo Artist 
|
| style="text-align:center;" rowspan="3" |
|-
|rowspan="2"| "SexyBack"
|Best R&B/Urban Dance Track
|
|-
|Best Pop Dance Track
|
|-
|rowspan="3"| 2008
|rowspan="2"| "LoveStoned"
|Best R&B/Urban Dance Track 
|
| style="text-align:center;" rowspan="3" |
|-
|Best Pop Dance Track
|
|-
| "Ayo Technology" (with 50 Cent)
|Best Rap/Hip Hop Dance Track 
|
|-
| 2009
| "4 Minutes" (with Madonna)
|Best Pop Dance Track
|
| style="text-align:center;" rowspan="1" |
|-
|rowspan="2"| 2014
| "Suit & Tie" (with Jay-Z)
|Best R&B/Urban Dance Track
|
| style="text-align:center;" rowspan="2" |
|-
| "Mirrors"
|Best R&B/Urban Dance Track
|
|}

JIM Awards
The JIM Awards are an annual awards show presented by the Flemish TV channel JIM. Timberlake has 4 nominations.

!
|-
|rowspan="4"| 2014
|rowspan="3"| Justin Timberlake
| Best Male – International 
| 
|style="text-align:center;" rowspan="4" |
|-
|Best Pop
| 
|-
|Best Dressed Male
| 
|-
| "Mirrors"
|Best Video
| 
|}

Juice TV Awards
The Juice TV Awards was an annual New Zealand music video award presentation.

!
|-
| 2003
| Justin Timberlake 
| Video Artist of the Year
| 
| style="text-align:center;" rowspan="1" |
|}

Juno Awards
The Juno Awards are presented annually to Canadian musical artists. There are also international categories.

!
|-
| 2007
| FutureSex/LoveSounds
| International Album of the Year
| 
| style="text-align:center;" rowspan="1" |
|}

Memphis Music Hall of Fame
Timberlake was inducted into the Memphis Music Hall of Fame, museum administered by the Memphis Rock N' Soul Museum, in 2015. Each inductee receives the Mike Curb Award.
 	

!
|-	
|2015
|Justin Timberlake
|Mike Curb Award	
|
| style="text-align:center;"|
|}

Meteor Ireland Music Awards
The Meteor Ireland Music Awards is an annual awards ceremony from the IRMA. Justin Timberlake received two awards.

!
|-
|rowspan="2" |2004
|rowspan="4" |Justin Timberlake
|Best Male Singer
|
|style="text-align:center;" rowspan="2"|
|-
|Best Live Performance
|
|-
|rowspan="2" |2007
|International Male Artist
|
|style="text-align:center;" rowspan="2"|
|-
|Best Live Performance
|

MTV Awards

MTV Asia Music Awards
The MTV Asia Awards is the Asian equivalent of the Europe MTV EMA. The show gave recognition and awards to Asian and international artists.

!
|-
| rowspan="2"|2004
| rowspan="1"|Justin Timberlake
|Favorite Male Artist
|
|style="text-align:center;" rowspan="2"|
|-
| "Cry Me a River" 
|Favorite Video
|
|-
|2008
| Justin Timberlake
| Favourite International Artist of Asia
|
|style="text-align:center;"|

MTV Australia Music Awards
The MTV Australia Awards is Australia's first awards show to celebrate both local and international acts.

!
|-
| rowspan="6"|2007
| rowspan="1"|FutureSex/LoveSounds  
|Album of the Year
|
|style="text-align:center;" rowspan="6"|
|-
| rowspan="2"|"SexyBack" (featuring Timbaland) 
|Sexiest Video
|
|-
|Best Hook Up
|
|-
| rowspan="3"|"What Goes Around.../...Comes Around"
|Video of the Year
|
|- 
|Best Male Artist
|
|-
|Best Pop Video
|
|-
| rowspan="2"|2008
| FutureSex/LoveShow Tour
| MTV Live Performer
|
| style="text-align:center;" rowspan="2"|
|-
| "Ayo Technology" (with 50 Cent & Timbaland)
|Video of the Year
|
|-
| 2009
| "4 Minutes" (with Madonna)
|Best Moves
|
| style="text-align:center;"|

MTV Brazil Music Awards

!
|-
| 2007
|Justin Timberlake  
|Best International Act
|
| style="text-align:center;"|

MTV Europe Music Awards
The MTV Europe Music Awards (EMAs) were established in 1994 by MTV Networks Europe to celebrate the most popular music videos in Europe. Justin Timberlake has received five awards from twenty nominations.

!
|-
|rowspan="5"|2003
|rowspan="3"| Justin Timberlake
| Best New Act
|
|style="text-align:center;" rowspan="5"|
|-
| Best Male
|
|-
| Best Pop
|
|-
|Justified
| Best Album
|
|-
|"Cry Me a River"
| Best Song
|
|-
|2005
|"Signs" (with Snoop Dogg and Charlie Wilson)
| Best Song
|
|style="text-align:center;"|
|-
|rowspan="2"|2006
|rowspan="2"| Justin Timberlake
| Best Male
|
|style="text-align:center;" rowspan="2"|
|-
| Best Pop
|
|-
|rowspan="4"|2007
|rowspan="3"| Justin Timberlake
| Best Live Act
|
|style="text-align:center;" rowspan="4"|
|-
| Best Solo
|
|-
| Best Urban
|
|-
|"What Goes Around... Comes Around"
|rowspan="2"| Video Star
|
|-
|2008
|"4 Minutes" (with Madonna)
|
|style="text-align:center;"|
|-
|rowspan="5"|2013
|rowspan="4"|Justin Timberlake
|Best Male
|
|style="text-align:center;" rowspan="5"|
|-
|Best Live Act
|
|-
|Best Look
|
|-
|Best US Act
|
|-
|rowspan="1"|"Mirrors"
|Best Video
|
|-
|rowspan="2"|2014
|rowspan="2"| Justin Timberlake
|Best Male
|
|style="text-align:center;" rowspan="2"|
|-
|Best Live Act
|
|}

MTV Italian Music Awards

!
|-
| 2007
| rowspan="4"| Justin Timberlake 
| rowspan="2"| Man of the Year 
| 
| style="text-align:center;" rowspan="2"|
|-
| 2008 
| 
|-
| 2014 
| Artist Saga 
| 
| style="text-align:center;"|
|-
| 2016 
| #MTVAwardsStar 
| 
| style="text-align:center;"|

MTV Japan Video Music Awards
The MTV Video Music Awards Japan is the Japanese version of the MTV VMAs. Justin Timberlake has received twelve nominations.

!
|-
| rowspan="2"|2003
| rowspan="2"|"Like I Love You"
|Best Male Video
|
| rowspan="9"|
|-
|Best Pop Video
|
|-
|2004
|"Rock Your Body"
|Best Male Video
|
|-
|rowspan="2"|2007
|rowspan="2"|"SexyBack"
|Best Male Video
|
|-
|Best Dance Video
|
|-
|rowspan="3"|2008
|rowspan="2"|"What Goes Around... Comes Around"
|Video of the Year
|
|-
|Best Male Video
|
|-
| "Ayo Technology" (with 50 Cent & Timbaland)
| Best Hip-Hop Video
| 
|-
|2009
|"4 Minutes" (with Madonna)
|Best Collaboration
|
|-
| rowspan="2"|2014
| rowspan="2"|"Take Back the Night"
|Best Male Video
|
| style="text-align:center;"|
|-
|Best Choreography
|
| style="text-align:center;"|
|-
| 2016
| "Can't Stop the Feeling!"
| Best Male Video International
| 
| style="text-align:center;"| 
|}

MTV Latinoamérica Video Music Awards

|-
| 2003
| rowspan="2"| Justin Timberlake 
| rowspan="2"| Best Pop Artist — International || 
|-
| 2007
|

MTV Movie & TV Awards 
The MTV Movie & TV Awards is a film and television awards show presented annually on MTV. Justin Timberlake received three nominations.

!
|-
|2007
|Alpha Dog
|Best Breakthrough Performance
|
| style="text-align:center;"|
|-
|2011
|The Social Network
| Best Line From a Movie
|
| style="text-align:center;"|
|-
| 2017
| "Can't Stop the Feeling!"
| Best Musical Moment
| 
| style="text-align:center;"|

MTV Russia Music Awards
The MTV Russia Music Awards have celebrated local Russian talent as well as international.

!
|-
| 2007 
| Justin Timberlake 
| Best Foreign Artist 
| 
| style="text-align:center;" rowspan="1"|

MTV Video Music Awards
The MTV Video Music Awards were established in 1984 by MTV to celebrate the top music videos of the year. Justin Timberlake has won eleven awards out of twenty-six nominations.

!
|-
|rowspan="7"|2003
|rowspan="5"|"Cry Me a River"
| Best Direction in a Video
|
| style="text-align:center;" rowspan="7"|
|-
| Best Pop Video
|
|-
| Best Male Video
|
|-
| Video of the Year
|
|-
| Viewer's Choice
|
|-
|rowspan="2"|"Rock Your Body"
| Best Choreography in a Video
|
|-
| Best Dance Video
|
|-
|2004
|"Señorita"
| Best Male Video
|
| style="text-align:center;"|
|-
|rowspan="7"|2007
|rowspan="2"| Justin Timberlake
| Male Artist of the Year
|
| style="text-align:center;" rowspan="7"|
|-
| Quadruple Threat of the Year
|
|-
|"My Love" (featuring T.I.)
| Best Choreography in a Video
|
|-
|"SexyBack" (featuring Timbaland)
| Most Earthshattering Collaboration
|
|-
|rowspan="3"|"What Goes Around... Comes Around"
| Best Director
|
|-
| Best Editing in a Video
|
|- 
| Video of the Year
|
|-
|rowspan="7"|2013
|rowspan="4"|"Mirrors"
|Best Pop Video
|
| style="text-align:center;" rowspan="7"|
|-
|Best Male Video
|
|-
|Video of the Year
|
|-
|Best Editing
|
|-
|rowspan="2"|"Suit & Tie" (featuring Jay Z)
|Best Collaboration
|
|-
|Best Direction
|
|-
|Justin Timberlake
|Michael Jackson Video Vanguard Award
|
|-
|2014
|"Love Never Felt So Good" (with Michael Jackson)
|Best Choreography
|
| style="text-align:center;"|
|-
|2016
|"Can't Stop the Feeling!"
|Song of Summer
|
| style="text-align:center;"|
|-
|rowspan="2"|2018
|"Filthy"
|Best Choreography
|
| style="text-align:center;" rowspan="2"|
|-
|"Say Something" (featuring Chris Stapleton)
|Best Direction
|
|}

TRL Awards

!
|-
|2003
|Justin Timberlake
|Rock the Mic 
|
| style="text-align:center;"|

MOBO Awards
The MOBO Award show is held annually in the United Kingdom to recognise artists of any ethnicity or nationality performing black music.

!
|-
|rowspan="2"| 2003
| Justin Timberlake  
| Best R&B Act 
| 
| style="text-align:center;" rowspan="2" |
|-
| Justified 
| Best Album 
| 
|-
| 2013
| Justin Timberlake  
| Best International Act 
| 
| style="text-align:center;"|
|-
|}

Myx Music Awards
The Myx Music Awards is an accolade presented by the cable channel Myx to honor the biggest hitmakers in the Philippines. 

!
|-
|2007
| "SexyBack"
|Favorite International Music Video · 
|
| style="text-align:center;"|
|}

NAACP Image Award 
An NAACP Image Award is an accolade presented by the American National Association for the Advancement of Colored People to honor outstanding people of color in film, television, music, and literature. Similar to other awards, like the Oscars and the Grammys, the 35 categories of the Image Awards are voted on by the award organization's members (that is, NAACP members). Honorary awards (similar to the Academy Honorary Award) have also been included, such as the President's Award, the Chairman's Award, Entertainer of the Year and The Image Award Hall of Fame.

!
|-
| 2011
| The Social Network
| Outstanding Supporting Actor in a Motion Picture
| 
| style="text-align:center;"|
|-
| rowspan="3" | 2014
| Himself
| Outstanding Male Artist
| 
| style="text-align:center;" rowspan="3" |
|-
| The 20/20 Experience
| Outstanding Album
| 
|-
| "Suit & Tie" (with Jay Z)
| Outstanding Duo or Group
| 
|-
| rowspan="2" | 2015
| "Love Never Felt So Good" (with Michael Jackson)
| Outstanding Music Video
| 
| style="text-align:center;" rowspan="2" |
|-
| "Brand New" (with Pharrell Williams)
| Outstanding Duo or Group
| 
|}

Nickelodeon Kids' Choice Awards 
The Nickelodeon Kids' Choice Awards is an annual awards show, that honors the year's biggest television, movie, and music acts, as voted by the people. Justin Timberlake has won three times out of sixteen nominations.

!
|-
|2003
|rowspan="11" | Justin Timberlake
|rowspan="4" | Favorite Male Singer
|
| style="text-align:center;" rowspan="4"| 
|-
|2004
|
|-
|2007
|
|-
|2008
|
|-
|2011
|The Big Help Award
|
| style="text-align:center;"|
|-
|rowspan="2"| 2014
|Favorite Male Singer
|
| style="text-align:center;"|
|-
|KCA Fan Army
|
| style="text-align:center;"|
|-
|2015
|Favorite Male Singer
|
| style="text-align:center;"|
|-
|rowspan=7|2017
|Favorite Male Singer
|
| style="text-align:center;" rowspan=7|
|-
|Favorite Voice From An Animated Movie
|
|-
|Favorite Frenemies
|
|-
|rowspan=2|"Can't Stop the Feeling!"
|Favorite Song
|
|-
|Favorite Music Video
|
|-
|Trolls
|Favorite Animated Movie 
|
|-
|Trolls: Original Motion Picture Soundtrack
|Favorite Soundtrack
|
|-
| 2019
| Justin Timberlake
| Favorite Male Artist
|
| style="text-align:center;"|
|-
| 2021
| Trolls World Tour
| Favorite Voice from an Animated Movie
| 
| style="text-align:center;"|
|}

Nickelodeon Australian Kids' Choice Awards

!
|-
|2007
| Justin Timberlake
| Favorite International Singer
|
| style="text-align:center;"|
|}

Nickelodeon UK Kids' Choice Awards

!
|-
|2007
| Justin Timberlake
| Best Male Singer
|
| style="text-align:center;" rowspan=1|
|}

NRJ Music Awards 
The NRJ Music Awards, created in 2000 by the radio station NRJ in partnership with the television network TF1. Justin Timberlake has won the award three times.

!
|-
|rowspan="2"|2004
| Justin Timberlake
|International Male Artist of the Year
|
| style="text-align:center;" rowspan="4" |
|-
|Justified
|International Album of the Year
|
|-
|rowspan="2"|2007
| Justin Timberlake
|International Male Artist of the Year
|
|-
|FutureSex/LoveSounds
|International Album of the Year
|
|-
|rowspan="3"|2008
| Justin Timberlake
|International Male Artist of the Year
|
| style="text-align:center;" rowspan="3" |
|-
| 50 Cent & Justin Timberlake 
| International Duo/Group of the Year   
|
|-
| "Ayo Technology" (with 50 Cent & Timbaland) 
| Video of the Year   
|
|-
| 2013
|rowspan="2"| Justin Timberlake
| International Male Artist of the Year
| 
| style="text-align:center;"|
|-
|rowspan=2|2016
| International Male Artist of the Year
| 
| style="text-align:center;" rowspan=2|
|-
| "Can't Stop the Feeling!"
| International Song of the Year
| 
|-
| 2018
| Justin Timberlake
| International Male Artist of the Year
| 
| style="text-align:center;"|
|}

Palm Springs International Film Festival 
Palm Springs International Film Festival is a film festival held in Palm Springs, California. Originally promoted by Mayor Sonny Bono and then sponsored by Nortel Networks Corporation. Justin Timberlake received the Ensemble Cast award.

!
|-
| 2011
| The Social Network
| Ensemble Cast
|  
| style="text-align:center;"|
|}

People's Choice Awards
The People's Choice Awards is an awards show recognizing the people and the work of popular culture. Justin Timberlake has received fourteen nominations and has won nine People's Choice Awards, including Favorite Album and Favorite Song.

!
|-
| style="text-align:center;" rowspan="1"| 2005
| "Where Is The Love?" (with The Black Eyed Peas)
| Favorite Combined Forces 
| 
| style="text-align:center;"|
|-
| style="text-align:center;" rowspan="1"| 2007
| "SexyBack"
| Favorite R&B Song
| 
| style="text-align:center;"|
|-
| style="text-align:center;" rowspan="3"| 2008
| "What Goes Around...Comes Around"
| Favorite Pop Song
| 
| style="text-align:center;" rowspan="3"|
|-
| "Give It to Me" 
| Favorite Hip-Hop Song
| 
|-
| Justin Timberlake
| Favorite Male Singer
| 
|-
| style="text-align:center;" rowspan="1"| 2009
| "4 Minutes"
| Favorite Combined Forces
| 
| style="text-align:center;"|
|-
| style="text-align:center;" rowspan="5"| 2014
| rowspan="3"|Justin Timberlake
| Favorite Male Artist
| 
| style="text-align:center;" rowspan="5"|
|-
| Favorite Pop Artist
| 
|-
| Favorite R&B Artist
| 
|-
| The 20/20 Experience
| Favorite Album
| 
|-
| "Mirrors" 
| Favorite Song
| 
|-
| style="text-align:center;" rowspan="3"| 2017
| rowspan="2"|Justin Timberlake
| Favorite Male Artist
| 
| style="text-align:center;" rowspan="3"|
|-
| Favorite Pop Artist
| 
|-
| "Can't Stop the Feeling!"
|Favorite Song
| 
|}

Pollstar Awards
The Pollstar Concert Industry Awards are held annually by Pollstar, to reward the best in the business of shows and concerts.
	
!
|-	
!scope="row" rowspan=2|2003
|rowspan=8| Justin Timberlake
|Most Creative Tour Package
|  	
| style="text-align:center;" rowspan=2| 
|-	
| Most Creative Stage Production
|  
|-
!scope="row" rowspan=3|2007
| Major Tour of the Year 
|  	
| style="text-align:center;" rowspan=3| 
|-
| Most Creative Tour Package 
|  	
|-
| Most Creative Stage Production 
|  	
|-
!scope="row" rowspan=2|2014
| Major Tour of the Year 
|  	
| style="text-align:center;" rowspan=2| 
|-
| Most Creative Stage Production  
| 
|-
!scope="row"|2018
| Best Pop Tour
|
| style="text-align:center;"|
|-

Pop Awards
The Pop Awards are presented annually by Pop Magazine, honoring the best in popular music. Justin Timberlake has won one award from two nominations.

!	
|-
! scope="row" rowspan="2" |2019
| Justin Timberlake
| Artist of The Year
| 
| style="text-align:center;" rowspan="2" |
|-
| "Say Something" )
| Song of the Year
| 
|}

Premios Oye!
Premios Oye! (Premio Nacional a la Música Grabada) are presented annually by the Academia Nacional de la Música en México.

!
|-
|2007
|Futuresex/Lovesounds 
| Album of the Year
|
| style="text-align:center;"|
|-
|2008
|"4 Minutes" (with Madonna)
|Record of the Year
|
| style="text-align:center;"|
|}

Radio Disney Music Awards 
The Radio Disney Music Awards is an annual awards show which is operated and governed by Radio Disney.

!
|-
| style="text-align:center;" rowspan="1"| 2003
| rowspan=5 |Justin Timberlake
| Male with Most Style
| 
| style="text-align:center;"|
|-
| style="text-align:center;" rowspan="1"| 2004
| rowspan=4 |Best Male Artist
| 
| style="text-align:center;"|
|-
| style="text-align:center;" rowspan="1"| 2005
| 
| style="text-align:center;"|
|-
| style="text-align:center;" rowspan="1"| 2007
| 
| style="text-align:center;"|
|-
| style="text-align:center;" rowspan="1"| 2014
| 
| style="text-align:center;"|
|-
| style="text-align:center;" rowspan="2"| 2017
| rowspan=2 | "Can't Stop the Feeling!"
| Song of the Year
| 
| style="text-align:center;" rowspan=2|
|-
| Best Song That Makes You Smile
| 
|}

Radio Music Awards
The Radio Music Awards was an annual U.S. award show that honored the year's most successful songs on mainstream radio.

!
|-
| 2003 
| Justin Timberlake
| Artist of the Year/Top 40 Radio
| 
| style="text-align:center;"|
|-

Rockbjörnen
The Rockbjörnen is a music prize in Sweden, divided into several categories, which is awarded annually by the newspaper Aftonbladet.

!
|-
|2006
|Justin Timberlake
|Foreign Artist of the Year
|
|style="text-align:center;" |
|}

RTHK International Pop Poll Awards
The RTHK International Pop Poll Awards is an annual award show presented at RTHK Studio 1 that honors the best in international and national music established in 1989.

!
|-
! scope="row" rowspan="2"|2013
|Justin Timberlake
|Top Male Artist
|style="background:#c96; text-align:center;"|3rd
|rowspan="2" style="text-align:center;" | 
|-
|"Suit & Tie"
|Top 10 International Gold Songs
|
|-
! scope="row" rowspan="2"|2014
|Justin Timberlake
|Top Male Artist
|style="background:#c96; text-align:center;"|3rd
|rowspan="2" style="text-align:center;" | 
|-
|"Mirrors"
|Top 10 International Gold Songs
|
|-
! scope="row" rowspan="2"|2017
|Justin Timberlake
|Top Male Artist
|style="background:#c96; text-align:center;"|3rd
|rowspan="2" style="text-align:center;" | 
|-
|"Can't Stop the Feeling!"
|Top 10 International Gold Songs
|
|}

San Diego Film Critics Society 
The San Diego Film Critics Society (SDFCS) is an organization of film reviewers from San Diego-based publications.

!
|-
| 2010
| The Social Network
| Best Performance by an Ensemble
| 
| style="text-align:center;"|

Satellite Awards 
The Satellite Awards is an annual award ceremony honoring the year's outstanding performers, films, and television shows, presented by the International Press Academy.

!
|-
| 2017
|  "Can't Stop the Feeling!" 
| Best Original Song
| 
| style="text-align:center;"|

Screen Actors Guild Award
The Screen Actors Guild Award (also known as the SAG Award) is an accolade given by the Screen Actors Guild‐American Federation of Television and Radio Artists (SAG-AFTRA) to recognize outstanding performances by its members. Justin Timberlake has been nominated once.

!
|-
| 2011
| The Social Network
| Outstanding Performance by a Cast in a Motion Picture
| 
| style="text-align:center;"|
|}

Smash Hits Awards
The Smash Hits Awards was an awards ceremony voted by readers of the Smash Hits magazine.

!
|-
| rowspan=2| 2003
| rowspan=4| Justin Timberlake
| Most Fanciable Male
| 
| style="text-align:center;" rowspan=2|
|-
| Best Dancer
| 
|-
| rowspan=2| 2004
| Most Fanciable Male
| 
| style="text-align:center;" rowspan=2|
|-
| Best Male Solo
| 
|}

Silver Clef Awards 
The Silver Clef Awards is an annual UK music awards lunch which has been running since 1976.

!
|-
|2014
| Justin Timberlake
| Best Live Act
| 
| style="text-align:center;"|
|}

Songwriters Hall of Fame 
The Songwriters Hall of Fame's Contemporary Icon Award was established in 2015 to recognize songwriter-artists who attained an iconic status in pop culture.

!
|-
| 2019
| Justin Timberlake
| Contemporary Icon Award
| 
| style="text-align:center;" |

Soul Train Music Awards 
The Soul Train Music Awards is an annual award show which previously aired in national television syndication, and honors the best in music and entertainment. Justin Timberlake has been nominated nine times.

!
|-
| rowspan="2" | 2003
| Justified
| Best R&B/Soul Album - Male
| 
| style="text-align:center;" rowspan="2" |
|-
| "Like I Love You" (featuring Clipse)
| Best R&B/Soul Single - Male
| 
|-
| rowspan="5" | 2013
| The 20/20 Experience
| Album of the Year
| 
| style="text-align:center;" rowspan="5" |
|-
| rowspan="2" | "Suit & Tie" (featuring Jay Z)
| Best Dance Performance
| 
|-
| Song of the Year
|
|-
| "Holy Grail" (with Jay Z)
| Best Hip Hop Song of the Year
| 
|-
| "Mirrors"
| The Ashford and Simpson Songwriters Award
| 
|-
| rowspan=2 | 2014
| rowspan=2 | "Love Never Felt So Good" (with Michael Jackson)
| Song of the Year
| 
| style="text-align:center;" rowspan=2 |
|-
| Best Collaboration
|

Spike Guys' Choice Awards
The Spike Guys' Choice Awards (formerly Guy's Choice Awards) is an awards show produced by the Viacom cable channel Spike and held since 2007. Timberlake has won one award.
 	

!
|-	
|2012 	
|Justin Timberlake
|Troops Choice for Entertainer of the Year
|
| style="text-align:center;"|
|}

TEC Awards
The TEC Awards is an annual award show recognizing the achievements of audio professionals. Justin Timberlake has been nominated four times.

!
|-
| 2007
| FutureSex/LoveSounds 
| Record Production/Album
| 
| style="text-align:center;"|
|-
| 2008
| FutureSex/LoveSounds World Tour
| Tour Sound Production
| 
| style="text-align:center;"|
|-
|rowspan="2"| 2014
| "Mirrors" 
| Record Production/Single or Track
| 
| style="text-align:center;" rowspan="2" |
|-
| The 20/20 Experience World Tour
| Tour/Event Sound Production
|

Teen Choice Awards 
The Teen Choice Awards were established in 1999 to honor the year's biggest achievements in music, movies, sports and television, being voted by young people aged between 13 and 19. Justin Timberlake has won 10 awards from 56 nominations. Timberlake received the Ultimate Choice Award at the 2007 show, and received the first-ever Decade Award at the 2016 show; the latter to celebrate his achievements since the release of FutureSex/LoveSounds.

!
|-
| 2000
| rowspan="8" | Justin Timberlake
| rowspan="3" | Choice Hottie Male
|
| style="text-align:center;"|
|-
| 2001
|
| style="text-align:center;"|
|-
| 2002
| 
| style="text-align:center;"|
|-
| rowspan="9" | 2003
|  Choice Music: Male Artist
| 
| style="text-align:center;" rowspan="9" |
|-
| Choice Music: Breakout Artist
| 
|-
| Choice Music: R&B/Hip-Hop Artist
| 
|-
| Choice Hottie Male
| 
|-
| Choice Fashion Icon: Male
| 
|-
| Justified
| Choice Music: Album
| 
|-
| rowspan="2" |  "Cry Me a River"
| Choice Music: Single
| 
|-
| Choice Music: Collaboration
| 
|-
| "Like I Love You"
| Choice Music: R&B/Hip-Hop Track
| 
|-
| rowspan="5" | 2004
| rowspan="4" | Justin Timberlake
| Choice Music: Male Artist
| 
| style="text-align:center;" rowspan="5" |
|-
| Choice Music: R&B Artist 
| 
|-
| Choice Hottie Male
| 
|-
| Choice Male Fashion Icon
| 
|-
| "Where Is the Love?" (with The Black Eyed Peas)
| Choice Music: Hook Up
| 
|-
| 2005
| Signs (with Snoop Dogg) & (Charlie Wilson)
| Choice Music: Collaboration 
|
| style="text-align:center;" |
|-
| 2006
| Justin Timberlake
| Choice Hottie Male
|
| style="text-align:center;" |
|-
| rowspan="5" | 2007
| Alpha Dog
| Choice Movie Breakout Star – Male
|
| style="text-align:center;" rowspan="5" |
|-
| "What Goes Around... Comes Around"
| Choice Music: Payback Track
|
|-
| rowspan="2" | Justin Timberlake
| Choice Music: Male Artist
| 
|-
| Ultimate Choice Award
| 
|-
| "Give It to Me"
| Choice Music: Single
|  
|-
| rowspan="3" | 2008
| Justin Timberlake  
| Choice Music: Male Artist
| 
| style="text-align:center;" rowspan="3" |
|-
| rowspan="2" | "4 Minutes" (with Madonna)
| Choice Music: Hook Up
| 
|-
| Choice Music: Single
| 
|-
| rowspan="2" | 2009
| "Love Sex Magic"
| Choice Music: Hook Up
|
| rowspan="2" style="text-align:center;"|
|-
| Justin Timberlake
| Choice Male Red Carpet Fashion Icon
| 
|-
| rowspan="4" | 2010
| rowspan="2" | Justin Timberlake
| Activist
| 
| style="text-align:center;" rowspan="2" |
|-
| Choice Red Carpet Fashion Icon Male
| 
|-
| "Carry Out" (with Timbaland)
| Choice Rap/Hip-Hop Track
| 
|-
| William Rast
| Choice Celebrity Fashion Line
| 
|-
| rowspan="5" | 2011
| Bad Teacher
| Actor Comedy
| 
| style="text-align:center;" rowspan="5" |
|-
| Yogi Bear
| Animation Voice
| 
|-
| Justin Timberlake
| Red Carpet Fashion Icon
| 
|-
| The Social Network
| Scene Stealer Male
| 
|-
| Friends with Benefits
| Summer Movie Star
| 
|-
| rowspan="2" | 2012
| In Time
| Movie Actor Drama
| 
| style="text-align:center;" rowspan="2"|
|-
| Justin Timberlake
| Red Carpet Fashion Icon
| 
|-
| rowspan="5" | 2013
| rowspan="2" | Justin Timberlake
| Choice Music: Male Artist
| 
| style="text-align:center;" rowspan="5"|
|-
| Choice Summer Music Star: Male
| 
|-
| "Mirrors"
| Choice Love Song
| 
|-
| "Suit & Tie"
| Choice Single: Male Artist
| 
|-
| Legends of the Summer Tour
| Choice Summer Tour
| 
|-
| rowspan="5" | 2014
| rowspan="3" | Justin Timberlake
| Choice Music: Male Artist
| 
| style="text-align:center;" rowspan="5" |
|-
| Choice Music: R&B/Hip Hop Artist
| 
|-
| Choice Social Media King
| 
|-
| "Not a Bad Thing"
| Choice Love Song
| 
|-
| The 20/20 Experience World Tour
| Choice Summer Tour
| 
|-
| rowspan="2" | 2015
| rowspan="2" | Justin Timberlake
| Social Media King
| 
| style="text-align:center;" rowspan="2" |
|-
| Choice Twit
| 
|-
| rowspan="4" | 2016
| rowspan="3" | "Can't Stop the Feeling!"
| Choice Party Song
| 
| style="text-align:center;" rowspan="3" | 
|-
| Choice Song from a Movie or TV Show
| 
|-
| Choice Summer Song
| 
|-
| Justin Timberlake
| Decade Award
| 
| style="text-align:center;"| 
|-
| 2017
| Justin Timberlake
| Choice Twit
| 
| style="text-align:center;"| 
|-
| rowspan=2| 2018
| "Say Something" 
| Choice Song: Male Artist
| 
| style="text-align:center;" rowspan=2| 
|-
| Justin Timberlake
| Choice Instagrammer
|

Telehit Awards
Telehit Awards (Spanish: Premios Telehit) are an annual award show run by the Mexican music channel Telehit.

!
|-
|2013
|Justin Timberlake 
|International Music Quality Award
|
|style="text-align:center;"|
|-
|2016
|"Can't Stop the Feeling!"
|Song of the Year
|
|style="text-align:center;"|
|-
|}

TMF Awards
The TMF Awards were an annual television awards show broadcast live on TMF (The Music Factory).

!
|-
|rowspan=4| 2007 
|rowspan=3| Justin Timberlake 
| Best International Male Artist 
| 
|style="text-align:center;" rowspan="4"| 
|-
|Best Pop International powered by Donna
|
|-
|Best Live International
|
|-
| Lovestoned 
|Best Video International
|
|-
|2008
|Justin Timberlake
|Best International Male Artist
|
| style="text-align:center;"| 
|-
|2009
|Justin Timberlake
|Best International Male Artist
|
| style="text-align:center;"| 
|}

UK Music Video Awards
The UK Music Video Awards recognise music videos created over the past 12 months across a variety of genres.

!
|-
|2013
|"Mirrors"
|Best Pop Video – International
|
|style="text-align:center;"|
|-
|2018
|"Say Something" 
|Best Live Video
|
|style="text-align:center;"| 
|-
|}

V Chart Awards
The V Chart Awards is an awards show organised by YinYueTai. The V Chart is the Chinese counterpart to the American Billboard charts and Korean Gaon Charts. Timberlake has been nominated and won ones.

!
|-
!scope="row" rowspan="1"|2014
| Justin Timberlake
| Favorite Artist of the Year (Western)
| 
| rowspan="1" style="text-align:center;"|
|}

VH1 Big in '06 Awards
VH1 Big in '06 Awards was the 2006 annual award show that aired on December 3, 2006 on VH1 in the United States.

!
|-
|2006
|Justin Timberlake
|Big Music Artist
|
|style="text-align:center;"|
|-
|}

Vibe Music Awards 
The Vibe Music Awards is a music and entertainment ceremony founded by producer Quincy Jones. The publication predominantly features R&B and hip-hop music artists, actors and other entertainers. Justin Timberlake has been nominated once.

!
|-
| 2003
|Justified
| Album of the Year
| 
| style="text-align:center;"|

Virgin Media Music Awards
The Virgin Media Music Awards is an annual awards ceremony presented by Virgin Media. Justin Timberlake has received five nominations.

!
|-
!scope="row" rowspan="2"|2006
| rowspan="3"| Justin Timberlake 
| Best Solo Artist 
| 
|style="text-align:center;" rowspan="2"|
|-
| Most Fanciable Male 
| 
|-
!scope="row" rowspan="3"|2007
|Most Fanciable Male
|
|style="text-align:center;" rowspan="1"|
|-
|rowspan="2"|"What Goes Around... Comes Around"
|Best Track
|
|style="text-align:center;" rowspan="1"|
|-
|Best Video
|
|style="text-align:center;" rowspan="1"|

Washington D.C. Area Film Critics Association
The Washington D.C. Area Film Critics Association (WAFCA) is a group of film critics based out of Washington, D.C. that was founded in 2002. WAFCA is composed of nearly 50 DC-based film critics from television, radio, print and the internet. The group annually gives awards to the best in film as voted on by its members.

!
|-
|2010
|The Social Network
|Best Ensemble
|
| style="text-align:center;"|

World Music Awards 
The World Music Awards is an international awards show founded in 1989 that annually honored recording artists based on worldwide sales figures provided by the International Federation of the Phonographic Industry (IFPI). Justin Timberlake has won the award three times.

!
|-
| rowspan="2" | 2007
| rowspan="4" | Justin Timberlake
| World's Best Selling American Artist
|
| style="text-align:center;" rowspan="2" |
|-
| World's Best Selling Pop Male Artist
| 
|-
| rowspan="12" | 2014
| World's Best Entertainer of the Year
| 
| style="text-align:center;" rowspan="12" |
|-
| World's Best Male Artist
| 
|-
| The 20/20 Experience
| World's Best Album
| 
|-
| "Suit & Tie"
| World's Best Song
| 
|-
| rowspan=2| "Mirrors"
| World's Best Song
| 
|-
| World's Best Video
| 
|-
| Justin Timberlake
| World's Best-selling Pop Rock Male Artist
| 
|-
| rowspan=2| "Holy Grail"
| World's Best Song
| 
|-
| World's Best Video
| 
|-
| "Take Back the Night"
| rowspan=3| World's Best Song
| 
|-
| "TKO"
| 
|-
| "Tunnel Vision"
|

World Soundtrack Awards
The World Soundtrack Awards are given by the World Soundtrack Academy to honor the best movie soundtracks.

!
|-
|2017
|"Can't Stop the Feeling"
|Best Original Song written directly for a Film
|
| style="text-align:center;"|

Notes

References

External links
 

Timberlake, Justin
Timberlake, Justin
Justin Timberlake